Sebastian Schmidt (born 6 January 1985 in Wiesbaden, West Germany) is a German rower who competed in the 2008 Summer Olympics in the men's eight and 2012 Summer Olympics in the men's four. He is also a two-times World Champion in the men's eight.

References
 

1985 births
Living people
Olympic rowers of Germany
Rowers at the 2008 Summer Olympics
Rowers at the 2012 Summer Olympics
Sportspeople from Wiesbaden
World Rowing Championships medalists for Germany
German male rowers